The 1998 AMP Bathurst 1000 was the 40th running of the Bathurst 1000 touring car race. It was held on 4 October 1998 at the Mount Panorama Circuit just outside Bathurst. It was the second year of the controversial split between race organisers, the Australian Racing Drivers Club, and V8 Supercar, which had led to Australia's leading touring car series leaving the Bathurst 1000. The V8 Supercar teams raced the 1998 FAI 1000 race, held six weeks later. The race distance was 161 laps, approximately 1000 km.

Class structure
The 1998 AMP Bathurst 1000 was an endurance race for Super Touring Cars, New Zealand Touring Cars and Production Cars.

ST
The class featured International Group 2 Touring Cars, otherwise known as Supertouring. It featured teams from Australia, New Zealand and Great Britain fielding a total of 28 cars. Featured cars were: Alfa Romeo 155, Audi A4, BMW 318i, BMW 320i, Ford Mondeo, Holden Vectra, Honda Accord, Hyundai Lantra, Nissan Primera, Peugeot 405, Peugeot 406, Toyota Carina, Vauxhall Cavalier, Vauxhall Vectra and Volvo S40.

NZ
The New Zealand touring car series, Schedule S, was invited and the ten car entry featured: BMW 320i, BMW 325i, Ford Telstar, Honda Integra, Nissan Sentra, Peugeot 405, Suzuki Baleno, Toyota Corolla and Toyota Corona.

3E
Production cars, conforming to an older version of the Australian Production Car Championship regulations were also invited with five cars arriving. They cars were: Honda Civic, Mazda 626 and Toyota Camry.

Top ten run-off
Post-qualifying shootout results as follows:

Official results
Race results as follows:

Statistics
 Provisional Pole Position – #80 Greg Murphy
 Pole Position – #40 Rickard Rydell – 2:14.9265
 Fastest Lap – #40 Rickard Rydell – 2:17.9558 – Lap 153
 Average Speed – N/A
 Race Time – 6:54:23.4756

References

 
 
 Auto Action, 2–8 October 1998
 Auto Action, 9–15 October 1998

Motorsport in Bathurst, New South Wales
AMP Bathurst 1000